Bridgeport Hungaria was an American soccer club based in Bridgeport, Pennsylvania that was a member of the American Soccer League.

The team was formed to replace the Newark Skeeters who had folded before the merger of the ASL and the Eastern Soccer League. After 10 games, the club moved to Newark, New Jersey but folded after only five more games.  On January 26, 1930, Hungaria lost, 4-0, to the New Bedford Whalers in the first round of the National Challenge Cup.

Year-by-year

References

Defunct soccer clubs in Pennsylvania
American Soccer League (1921–1933) teams
1930 establishments in Pennsylvania
1930 disestablishments in Pennsylvania
Association football clubs established in 1930
Association football clubs disestablished in 1930